Alice or the Last Escapade is a 1977 French fantasy film written and directed by Claude Chabrol. The film is very loosely inspired by the 1865 novel Alice's Adventures in Wonderland by Lewis Carroll, including the protagonist's name being Alice Carroll (a combination of the Alice character and the author's pseudonymous surname).

Plot
While leaving her husband, whom she has grown to despise, Alice (Sylvia Kristel) drives into the pristine countryside. She must stop at an old house,  when her windshield has cracked mysteriously. An old man and his butler welcome her at the mansion as if she were expected. The old man insists on her staying overnight. They even offer to have her car repaired in the morning.

Alice is woken up in the middle of the night by a booming noise. The next day the car is there, with a new windshield. But Alice finds herself alone in the deserted house. After enjoying a good breakfast laid out for her, Alice jumps into the car again. She soon realizes that she cannot find the gateway to the country house from whence she came. A tree trunk seems to be in the way.

Reluctantly, Alice returns to the old house. She then tries to walk the way with her suitcase. In her attempt to do so, Alice meets  a young man who tells her to accept the fact that there is no way out. Is she in limbo? She has to spend a second night in the mansion. The old man is there again and provides some explanations.

The following day is a bright morning full of birdsong. Once more breakfast is ready for her in the lonely house. She takes the car again and finds the path and the gate to the highway. Is she really out? A few more strange characters come her way. Her windshield cracks again.

Principal cast

Critical reception
From TV Guide:

From www.devlidead.com:

References

External links 

1977 films
1977 horror films
1970s fantasy films
1970s horror thriller films
French horror thriller films
Adultery in films
French dark fantasy films
Films based on Alice in Wonderland
Films directed by Claude Chabrol
French ghost films
French haunted house films
Paranormal films
Supernatural thriller films
French supernatural horror films
Films set in country houses
1970s French-language films
1970s French films